Sumsabashevo (Sumsabaş) is a rural locality (a village) in Vanyshevsky Selsoviet, Burayevsky District, Bashkortostan, Russia. The population was 2 as of 2010. There is 1 street.

Geography 
Sumsabashevo is located 36 km north of Burayevo (the district's administrative centre) by road. Novoyashevo is the nearest rural locality.

References 

Rural localities in Burayevsky District